Vijaygiri Bava (born 24 March 1987) is an Indian filmmaker and screenwriter who primarily works in Gujarati cinema.

Career 
He made his debut as a director in the film Premji: Rise of a Warrior (2015), for which he received the State Film Award in best film category.

His second film Montu Ni Bittu, starring Maulik Nayak and Aarohi Patel and written by Raam Mori, was released in 2019. Its story follows a love triangle between the two title characters Montu and Bittu. His next film, 21mu Tiffin, starring  Netri Trivedi, Niilam Paanchal and Raunaq Kamdar, was released in 2021. He produces films under his banner Vijaygiri Filmos.

Bava has directed a short film Mahotu written by Raam Mori.

Personal life
Bava completed his schooling at his native place Kheralu. He received Bachelor of Arts in 2007 from L. D. Arts College, Ahmedabad. He married Twinkle Bava in 2011, and they have a daughter.

Filmography

Accolades
Bava's Premji: Rise of a Warrior won the State Film Award for best film category. Premji received 10 State Award for Films from Gujarat government, and Transmedia Screen and Stage Award. Bava received Transmedia Screen and Stage Award for best dialogue category. He was awarded the Best Director Award at the 19th Transmedia Gujarati Screen and Stage Awards for Montu Ni Bittu. He also won the 2019 GIFA award for Best Director for Montu Ni Bittu.

GIFA -Gujarati Iconic Film Award

References

External links

Living people
Gujarati-language film directors
21st-century Indian film directors
Indian male screenwriters
Gujarati people
Film directors from Gujarat
1987 births